The governor of Sultan Kudarat, is the chief executive of the provincial government of Sultan Kudarat.

Provincial Governors (1973-2025)

References

Governors of Sultan Kudarat
Sultan Kudarat